Lieutenant-Colonel Ronald Thomas "Rony"  Stanyforth,  (30 May 1892 – 20 February 1964) was an Army officer and English amateur first-class cricketer, who played for Yorkshire County Cricket Club and England, captaining England in the four Test matches he played in.

Stanyforth was born at Chelsea, London, England, the son of Edwin Wilfrid Stanyforth (born Edwin Wilfrid Greenwood) of Kirk Hammerton Hall, Yorkshire. He was educated at Eton and Christ Church, Oxford. He played for Oxford University in 1914 and then served in World War I. He was awarded the MC and CVO. After the war he played for Combined Services in 1922, Army from 1923 to 1929, Marylebone Cricket Club (MCC) from 1923 to 1933 and H. D. G. Leveson Gower's XI in 1926. In 1926 he played one game for Langholm Cricket Club after being invited to by the Earl of Dalkeith.

Stanyforth, a wicket-keeper, captained England against South Africa in 1927–28, and he won two, lost one and drew once. However, the series was a draw as the fifth Test, when Greville Stevens stood in for Stanyforth, was lost.

Only three of Stanyforth's sixty one first-class games were played for Yorkshire County Cricket Club in the County Championship, and all three came in 1928 after he had captained England. He also played for the Free Foresters from 1930 to 1933.

Stanyforth served in the 21st Lancers, as Aide-de-camp to General Alan Brooke 1939–1940, and as GSO1 21st Army Group 1941–1945.

Stanyforth died at Kirk Hammerton, Yorkshire, in February 1964, aged 72. He was a trustee of the MCC at the time of his death, and the author of Wicketkeeping, published in 1935.

Family
Ronald was the great-great-grandson of Samuel Staniforth and the great-great-great-grandson of Thomas Staniforth, both former Lord Mayor of Liverpool. His father Edwin Stanyforth was born Edwin Greenwood, however he changed his name at the request of his great uncle Rev. Thomas Staniforth of Storrs Hall in his will. Edwin was the son of Ripon member of parliament and resident of Swarcliffe Hall, John Greenwood.

References

External links
Cricinfo

1892 births
1964 deaths
21st Lancers officers
Alumni of Christ Church, Oxford
British Army cricketers
British Army personnel of World War I
British Army personnel of World War II
Combined Services cricketers
Commanders of the Royal Victorian Order
Cricketers from Chelsea, London
England Test cricket captains
English cricketers of 1919 to 1945
English cricketers
Free Foresters cricketers
H. D. G. Leveson Gower's XI cricketers
Marylebone Cricket Club cricketers
Oxford University cricketers
People educated at Eton College
Recipients of the Military Cross
Yorkshire cricketers
Military personnel from London
Wicket-keepers
England Test cricketers